Apollo Room may refer to:
 Apollo Room in the historic Raleigh Tavern in Williamsburg, Virginia, United States
 St George's Hall and Apollo Room of the Winter Palace, in Saint Petersburg, Russia
 Salon of Apollo in the Palace of Versailles, France
 Galerie d'Apollon in the Louvre Museum in Paris, France